The Taurus Model 82 is a 6-shot, .38 Special, medium frame revolver manufactured by Taurus. Some variations of the Model 82 feature a lanyard loop to secure the revolver. The revolver is similar in configuration to the Smith and Wesson Model 10 which at one time was the mainstay of law enforcement agencies in the United States.

Usage  
The Model 82 is the standard issue sidearm of Indonesian National Police and issued with locally manufactured .38 caliber ammunition by Pindad.

In Brazil, it was the standard issue police firearm for many years, but has been replaced by .40 S&W pistols (also made by Taurus) in last years. However, is still in use by private security firms and municipal guards. Carabineros de Chile, the Chilean uniformed police also uses the Taurus 82 as standard issue firearm.

Users  
 
 
 ：Hong Kong Police Force, potential user

References

.38 Special firearms
Taurus revolvers
Police weapons